Bandar Putra Permai is a township in Seri Kembangan, Petaling District, Selangor, Malaysia. This township is located between Serdang and Putrajaya.

Petaling District
Townships in Selangor